Bailen may refer to:

People

 Nick Bailen (born 1989), American-Belarusian ice hockey defensemen

Places
 Bailén, a town in Jaén, Spain
 Bailén (Vino de la Tierra), a Spanish geographical indication for Vino de la Tierra wines located in the autonomous region of Andalusia
 General Emilio Aguinaldo, Cavite, a municipality in the Philippines, which was formerly and still commonly known as Bailen
 Bailén (Metrovalencia), a metro station in Valencia

Other
 Bailen (band), American rock band
 Battle of Bailén of 1808

See also
 Bailén-Miraflores, one of the 11 districts of the city of Málaga, Spain